The Calgary Black Chambers is a Canadian society of black professionals that promotes leadership capacity, advocates for social justice, and runs the Calgary Black Achievement Awards.

Organization 

Jon Cornish, Kiran Seetal, Chi Iliya-Ndule, Kene Ilochonwu, Michael Lee Hing, Chucks Okafor, Akwasi Antwi, Clarence Wynter, and Charles Buchanan, founded the Calgary Black Chambers in 2020. As of February 2022, Calgary Black Chambers had 200 members.

Activities 
Calgary Black Chambers provides fifteen annual educational scholarships between $1,000 and $8,000. It also provides mentorship to secondary students and runs the Calgary Black Achievement Awards.

In 2022, the Calgary Black Chambers received the Friends of Education Award from the Alberta School Board Association for the Soft Skills curriculum. The same yer, the organization called for an inquiry into the killing of Latjor Tuel.

References

External links 

 Official website

Organizations based in Calgary
2020 establishments in Alberta
Organizations established in 2020
Community organizations
Civil rights organizations in Canada